Carletti is an Italian surname. Notable people with the surname include:

Angelo Carletti di Chivasso (1411–1495), Italian theologian
Beppe Carletti (born 1946), Italian musician
Bertrand Carletti (born 1982), French volleyball player
Cristian Carletti (born 1996), Italian footballer 
Cristóforo Chrisostome Carletti (1564–1634), Italian Roman Catholic bishop
Eduardo J. Carletti (born 1951), Argentine science fiction writer
Francesco Carletti (1573 – 1636), Florentine merchant, explorer and writer
Giuseppe Carletti (born 1959), former Italian World Cup alpine ski racer
Joseph Carletti (born 1946), former French racing cyclist
Louise Carletti (1922–2002), French film actress
Massimiliano Carletti (born 1973), Italian footballer
Tommaso Carletti (1860–1919), Governor of Italian Somalia

Italian-language surnames
Patronymic surnames
Surnames from given names